The men's rugby sevens tournament at the 2018 Central American and Caribbean Games was held in Colombia. It was hosted at the Estadio Moderno in Barranquilla. The tournament was held from 1 August to 2 August 2018, starting with group matches before finishing with the medal ceremony on 2 August. The 2018 Games marked the second time that rugby sevens has been played at the Central American and Caribbean Games.

Qualified teams

Competition schedule
The men's rugby tournament takes place over two days:

Pool stage
In pool play, each team plays one match against the other three teams in the group. Three points are awarded for a win, two points - for a draw, and one point - for a loss.

Pool A

Pool B

Knockout stage
The knockout stages were scheduled for August 2.

5–8th place playoff

Semi-finals

Seventh place

Fifth-place final

Medal Playoff

Quarter-finals

Semi-finals

Bronze-medal match

Gold-medal match

Final ranking

References

2018 Central American and Caribbean Games events
Central American and Caribbean Games
2018